Dactylobatus is a genus of skates in the family Rajidae. They are found in deep waters in the western Atlantic Ocean from Brazil to the United States, including the Gulf of Mexico.

Species
Two species are recognized in this genus:
 Dactylobatus armatus B. A. Bean & A. C. Weed, 1909 (skillet skate)
 Dactylobatus clarkii (Bigelow & Schroeder, 1958) (hook skate)

References

Rajiformes
Ray genera
Taxa named by Barton Appler Bean